Album is a 2002 Indian Tamil-language romantic drama film written and directed by Vasanthabalan making his directorial debut, starring newcomer Rajesh and Shrutika. The story portrays the love and affection between two families. The film, produced by Kavithalayaa Productions, was Vasanthabalan's directorial debut and became an average success. It is however best known for featuring the popular chartbuster track "Chellame Chellam" from Karthik Raja's soundtrack to the film, which was award-winning playback singer Shreya Ghoshal's first song in Tamil language. The plot revolves around Jeeva and Viji's family who are neighbours to each other. Viji falls in love with Jeeva and they both start loving each other. How they over come their hurdles and unite forms the story.

Cast

Release
The satellite rights of the film were sold to Jaya TV.

Soundtrack
The soundtrack, featuring seven tracks, was composed by Karthik Raja. The song "Chellame Chellam" became very popular and emerged a chartbuster. It was notably the first Tamil song rendered by acclaimed singer Shreya Ghoshal for a Tamil film soundtrack. Karthik Raja's father, Ilaiyaraaja, and his sister, Bhavatharini, had performed each one song as well.

Release 
Malathi Rangarajan of The Hindu opined that "Acting to avoid a contrived storyline and melodrama is fine. But then, in a film, something has to keep happening for the tempo to be sustained".

References

External links

2002 films
2000s Tamil-language films
2002 directorial debut films
Films directed by Vasanthabalan
Films scored by Karthik Raja